In the canon law of the Catholic Church, a procurator is one who acts on behalf of and by virtue of the authority of another. In a monastery, the procurator is the friar, monk or nun charged with administering its financial affairs. Bishops have been represented at councils by procurators, as Peter Canisius attended the Council of Trent as procurator for the Bishop of Augsburg.

Procurator at Rome 
Catholic Religious institutes, societies of apostolic life and autonomous particular Churches sui iuris (especially Eastern Catholic, each using a non-Latin rite) may have representatives resident in Rome acting on their behalf in business they may have with the Holy See.

Thus a Prelate (not Ordinary elsewhere) is appointed as Procurator for the Patriarch of Antioch of the Greek-Melkite Church. Such procuration may be combined with the office of Apostolic Visitator for that rite-specific church (especially in Europe)

Internal regular procurators 
Within the above regular institutes of consecrated life and societies of apostolic life, the person charged with matters such as the purchase of provisions, furniture, books and other supplies may be called a procurator. This officer may be called a provincial procurator or a procurator general, if looking after the needs of a province or of the institute as a whole. In other institutes, the terms used may be bursar or econome.

Canonical litigation 
A party to litigation may generally appoint a procurator instead of responding personally.

The name "fiscal procurator" or "fiscal promoter" was previously used in canon law for the official known since the publication of the 1917 Code of Canon Law as the promoter of justice, whose function is to safeguard the public welfare in cases brought before ecclesiastical tribunals.
 
In canonization cases, the corresponding official was called the promoter of the faith or, in popular parlance, the devil's advocate.

See also 
 Apocrisiarius
 Proctor

References

Sources and external links 
 GCatholic passim, here page Recent Appointments in the Eastern Churches

Canon law of the Catholic Church
Catholic ecclesiastical titles
Tribunals of the Catholic Church